Marchisio is an Italian surname, particularly common in Piedmont. Notable people with the surname include:

 Claudio Marchisio (b. 1986), Italian footballer
 Juvenal P. Marchisio (1902–1973), American lawyer, judge and president of American Relief for Italy
 Luigi Marchisio (1909–1992), Italian cyclist
 Rita Marchisio (b. 1950), Italian runner
 Rosina Lawrence Marchisio (1912–1997), Canadian-American actress

References

Italian-language surnames